Thomas William Meany (September 21, 1903 – September 11, 1964) was an American sports writer who mostly covered baseball in the New York City area.

Biography
Meany's love of sports began at St. John's Prep in Brooklyn, where he wrote for the school newspaper and played basketball and baseball.

Meany began his professional writing career in 1922, where he was recruited to write for the New York Journal. Throughout his career, Meany worked for several newspapers, including the Brooklyn Daily Times, New York World-Telegram, and the Morning Telegraph. He wrote several books, including The Magnificent Yankees about members of the New York Yankees, which was published in 1952. In 1961, Meany joined the New York Mets baseball team as a publicity director, and later served as their promotions director.

Meany died at Roosevelt Hospital in Manhattan in 1964; he was survived by his wife, Clara Maxwell. In 1975, Meany was posthumously voted the J. G. Taylor Spink Award, the highest award bestowed by the Baseball Writers' Association of America (BBWAA).

Books

References

External links
Baseball Hall of Fame
 

1903 births
1964 deaths
20th-century American non-fiction writers
American newspaper journalists
American publicists
Baseball writers
New York World
Sportspeople from Brooklyn
Sportspeople from Queens, New York
Sportswriters from New York (state)
Writers from Brooklyn
New York Mets personnel
Death in New York (state)
BBWAA Career Excellence Award recipients